Sime Darby Property was created through the integration of the property arms under the former Golden Hope Plantations Berhad, Kumpulan Guthrie Berhad, and Sime Darby Berhad. Apart from its 20,763 acres of landbank spanning from Selangor to Johor, Sime Darby Property also has assets and operations across the Asia Pacific region and the United Kingdom. It is one of the largest property developers in the country by revenue and gross development value (GDV) of current projects.

The division was formed through the integration of the property arms of Golden Hope, Guthrie and Sime Darby during the 2007 Synergy Drive merger. The property arm of Sime Darby traces back to United Estates Projects Berhad, a property development company established in 1964. In 1985, Sime Darby purchased a large stake in United Estates Projects Berhad and the company was renamed Sime UEP Properties Berhad. Sime UEP was used to develop former oil palm plantation lands belonging to Sime Darby.

Sime UEP was the developer of Subang Jaya (which commenced in 1974), which has become one of the most populated townships in the Klang Valley. This was followed by the developments of USJ and Putra Heights in the surrounding areas by Sime UEP. Bukit Jelutong was developed by Guthrie beginning in 1994 on its former plantation lands. The 299-hectare Ara Damansara development by Sime UEP was launched in 2000.

Aside from its developments in the Klang Valley, Sime Darby Property has residential projects in Negeri Sembilan, Johor and Singapore. It also owns TPC Kuala Lumpur which has hosted the Malaysian Open, CIMB Classic and Sime Darby LPGA Malaysia tournaments. Sime Darby Property is also a 40-percent joint venturer in the Battersea Power Station redevelopment project.

As of September 2014, the company has a land bank of 19,000 acres (7,689 hectares), not including plantation land owned by Sime Darby Plantations which could be converted for development in the future.

Sime Darby demerger

In 2017, Sime Darby announced its intention to spin off Sime Darby Property into a separate public company, without a definitive timeline. Analysts had previously speculated on the possibility of an initial public offering of the division or a merger with S P Setia by their common ultimate shareholder, Permodalan Nasional Berhad (PNB).

On 30 November 2017, Sime Darby Property was listed on Bursa Malaysia stock exchange. The company faltered in its debut on the Main Market of Bursa Malaysia by opening at RM1.30 at 9am against the issue price of RM1.50.

The property development business is complemented by investment in 2 other business segments, namely, property investment and, leisure and hospitality.

In May 2018,  Sime Darby partnered with Japan’s Mitsui & Co Ltd and Mitsubishi Estate Co Ltd.

References

External links

2007 establishments in Malaysia
Property companies of Malaysia
Real estate companies established in 2007
Companies based in Kuala Lumpur
Companies based in Petaling Jaya
Companies listed on Bursa Malaysia